Meadville is an album of live recordings, sold only on concerts. The Two Pale Boys are Keith Moliné on midi-guitar and Andy Diagram on "trumpet through electronics".

Track listing
All tracks composed by David Thomas; except where indicated
"Obsession" (Keith Moliné) – 4:29
"Nobody Knows"  – 9:38
"Red Sky"  – 5:37
"Can't Help Falling in Love" (George David Weiss, Hugo Peretti, Luigi Creatore) – 3:52
"Nowheresville" (Andy Diagram, Keith Moliné) – 6:00
"Fire"  – 5:35
"Kathleen"  – 10:26
"Surfer Girl / Around The Fire" (Brian Wilson) – 10:31
"Beach Boys"  – 6:38
"Weird Cornfields" (Andy Diagram, Keith Moliné) – 5:52
"Busman's Honeymoon"  – 5:35

Personnel
David Thomas and Two Pale Boys
David Thomas
Keith Moliné
Andy Diagram

David Thomas (musician) albums
1997 live albums